The Party of European Socialists (PES) is a social democratic and progressive European political party.

The PES comprises national-level political parties from all member states of the European Union (EU) plus Norway and the United Kingdom. This includes major parties such as the Social Democratic Party of Germany, the French Socialist Party, the British Labour Party, the Italian Democratic Party, the Socialist Party (Portugal), the Romanian Socialist Democrat Party and the Spanish Socialist Workers' Party. Parties from a number of other European countries and from the Mediterranean region are also admitted to the PES as associate or observer parties. Most member, associate, and observer parties are members of the wider Progressive Alliance or Socialist International.

The PES is currently led by its president, Stefan Löfven, a former Prime Minister of Sweden. Its political group in the European Parliament is the Progressive Alliance of Socialists and Democrats (S&D). The PES also operates in the European Committee of the Regions (in the PES Group in the Committee of the Regions) and the European Council.

Name
The party's English name is "Party of European Socialists". In addition, the following names are used in other languages:

 
 
 
 
 
 
 
 
 
 
 
 
 
 
 
 
 
 
 
 
 
 
 
 
 
 
 
 
 
 
 

In March 2014 following the congress in Rome, the PES added the tagline "Socialists and Democrats" to its name following the admission of Italy's Democratic Party into the organisation.

History

1960s
In 1961, the Socialists in the European Parliament attempted to produce a common 'European Socialist Programme' but this was neglected due to the applications of Britain, Denmark, Ireland and Norway to join the European Community. The Socialists' 1962 congress pushed for greater democratisation and powers for Parliament, though it was only in 1969 that this possibility was examined by the member states.

1970s 
In 1973, Denmark, Ireland and the United Kingdom joined the European Community, bringing in new parties from these countries. The enlarged Socialist Congress met in Bonn and inaugurated the Confederation of the Socialist Parties of the European Community. The Congress also passed a resolution on social policy, including the right to decent work, social security, democracy and equality in the European economy. In 1978, the Confederation of Socialist Parties approved the first common European election Manifesto. It focused on several goals among which the most important were to ensure a right to decent work, fight pollution, end discrimination, protect the consumer and promote peace, human rights and civil liberties.

1980s 
At its Luxembourg Congress in 1980, the Confederation of Socialist Parties approved its first Statute. The accession of Greece to the EU in 1981, followed by Spain and Portugal in 1986, brought in more parties.

In 1984, a common Socialist election manifesto proposed a socialist remedy for the economic crisis of the time by establishing a link between industrial production, protection of fundamental social benefits, and the fight for an improved quality of life.

1990s 
In 1992, with the European Community becoming the European Union and with the Treaty of Maastricht establishing the framework for political parties at a European level, the Confederation of Socialist Parties voted to transform itself into the Party of European Socialists. The party's first programme concentrated on job creation, democracy, gender equality, environmental and consumer protection, peace and security, regulation of immigration, discouragement of racism and fighting organised crime.

Along with the Socialist Group in the European Parliament, the founding members of the PES were:

 Social Democratic Party of Austria
 Socialist Party (Francophone) and the Socialist Party (Flemish) of Belgium
 Social Democrats of Denmark
 Socialist Party of France
 Social Democratic Party of Germany
 Panhellenic Socialist Movement of Greece
 Labour Party of Ireland
 Italian Democratic Socialist Party, Italian Socialist Party and Democratic Party of the Left of Italy
 Luxembourg Socialist Workers' Party
 Labour Party of the Netherlands
 Socialist Party of Portugal
 Spanish Socialist Workers' Party
 Swedish Social Democratic Party
 Labour Party and Social Democratic and Labour Party of the UK

2000s 
In 2004 Poul Nyrup Rasmussen defeated Giuliano Amato to be elected President of the PES, succeeding Robin Cook in the post. He was re-elected for a further 2.5 years at the PES Congress in Porto on 8 December 2006 and again at the Prague Congress in 2009.

2010s 
In 2010, the Foundation for European Progressive Studies was founded as the political foundation (think tank) of the PES.

Mr Rasmussen stood down at the PES Progressive Convention in Brussels on 24 November 2011. He was replaced as interim president by Sergey Stanishev, at the time chairman of the Bulgarian Socialist Party (BSP) and former prime minister of Bulgaria.

On 28–29 September 2012, the PES Congress in Brussels Congress elected interim president Sergey Stanishev as full President, as well as four deputies: Jean-Christophe Cambadélis (1st Vice-President – PS), Elena Valenciano (PSOE), Jan Royall (Labour) and Katarína Neveďalová (Smer-SD). The same Congress elected Achim Post (SPD) as its new secretary general, and adopted a process which it described as "democratic and transparent" for electing its next candidate for Commission President in 2014. 
Sergey Stanishev was re-elected PES President on 22–23 June 2015 in Budapest. The Congress also approved Achim Post (SPD) as the Secretary-General as well as the four Vice-Presidents: Jean-Christophe Cambadélis (PS), Carin Jämtin (Swedish Social Democratic Party), Katarína Neveďalová (Smer-SD) and Jan Royall (Labour).

On 7–8 December 2018, the PES Congress gathered in Lisbon to elect its leadership. Sergey Stanishev was confirmed as party President and Achim Post (SPD) as secretary general. Iratxe García (Spanish Socialist Workers' Party) was elected by the new presidency 1st Vice-President of the PES and Francisco André (Socialist Party (Portugal)), Katarína Neveďalová (Smer-SD) and Marita Ulvskog (Swedish Social Democratic Party) were elected PES Vice-Presidents. During the PES Presidency of October 2019, Heléne Fritzon (Swedish Social Democratic Party) became PES Vice-President, replacing Marita Ulvskog.

On 22-23 February 2019, the PES held its Election Congress in Madrid to endorse a Common Candidate and adopt its manifesto for the 2019 European Parliament election. The Election Congress acclaimed European Commission First Vice-President Frans Timmermans and adopted its manifesto: A New Social Contract for Europe.

2020s 

On 16 December 2021, the PES held its Council in Brussels, adopting the resolution: Fairness, Sustainability, Respect: a progressive vision for the future of Europe.

On 14-15 October 2022, the PES Congress in Berlin elected Stefan Löfven (Swedish Social Democratic Party) as PES President and welcomed a new PES leadership team: Caroline Gennez (Vooruit (political party)) as Treasurer, Iratxe García (Spanish Socialist Workers' Party) as First Vice President, Katarina Barley (SPD) and Francisco André (Socialist Party (Portugal)) as Executive Vice Presidents, Tanja Fajon (Social Democrats (Slovenia)), Victor Negrescu (Social Democratic Party (Romania)), Kati Piri (Labour Party (Netherlands)), Andrzej Szejna (New Left), and Radmila Šekerinska (Social Democratic Union of Macedonia) as Vice Presidents. Achim Post (SPD) continued as Secretary General, Giacomo Filibeck (Democratic Party (Italy)) took up the position of Executive Secretary General, Yonnec Polet (Socialist Party (Belgium)) remained as Deputy Secretary General, and Saar van Bueren (Labour Party (Netherlands)) became Deputy Secretary General. The Congress adopted the resolution: With Courage For Europe: leading Europe through change.

Organisation

Member parties
The PES has thirty-three full member parties from each of the twenty-seven EU member states, Norway and the UK. There are a further twelve associate and twelve observer parties from other European countries.

Constituent organisations
The youth organisation of the PES is the Young European Socialists. PES Women is the party's women's organisation, led by Zita Gurmai. The LGBTI campaign organisation is Rainbow Rose.

International memberships
PES is an associated organisation of Socialist International and the Progressive Alliance.

President and Presidency 
The President (currently former Prime Minister of Sweden Stefan Löfven) represents the party on a daily basis and chairs the Presidency, which also consists of the Secretary General, President of the S&D group in Parliament and one representative per full/associate member party and organisation. They may also be joined by the President of the European Parliament (if a PES member), a PES European Commissioner and a representative from associate parties and organisations.

The list below shows PES presidents and the presidents of its predecessors.

Governance
The parties meet at the party Congress twice every five years to decide on political orientation, such as adopting manifestos ahead of elections. Every year that the Congress does not meet, the Council (a smaller version of the Congress) shapes PES policy. The Congress also elects the party's President, Vice-Presidents and the Presidency.

The Leader's Conference brings together Prime Ministers and Party Leaders from PES parties three to four times a year to agree strategies and resolutions.

European election primaries
In December 2009, the PES decided to put forward a candidate for Commission President at all subsequent elections. On 1 March 2014, the PES organised for the first time a European election Congress where a Common Manifesto was adopted and the Common Candidate designate for the post of Commission President, Martin Schulz, was elected by over a thousand participants in Rome, Italy. 
In 2019, progressives elected Frans Timmermans as PES Common Candidate to the European Elections, during the Election Congress in Madrid on 22–23 February 2019.

PES in the European institutions

Overview of the European institutions

European Parliament

European Commission
European Commissioners are meant to remain independent, however there has been an increasing degree of politicisation within the Commission. In the current European Commission, nine of the Commissioners belong to the PES family.

European Council
Of the 27 heads of state and government that are members of the European Council, 6 are from the PES, and therefore regularly attend PES summits to prepare for European Council meetings.

In third countries
Through its associate and observer parties the PES has eight head of state or government in non-EU countries:

European Council and Council of Ministers

Party-alignment at the European Council is often loose, but has been the basis of some intergovernmental cooperation. At present seven countries are led by a PES-affiliated leader, who represents that state at the European Council: Germany (Olaf Scholz), Spain (Pedro Sánchez), Portugal (António Costa), Malta (Robert Abela), Denmark (Mette Frederiksen), Finland (Sanna Marin) and Sweden (Stefan Löfven).

The makeup of national delegations to the Council of Ministers is at some times subject to coalitions: for the above governments led by a PES party, that party may not be present in all Council configurations; in other governments led by non-PES parties a PES minister may be its representative for certain portfolios. PES is in coalition in the following countries: Italy, Luxembourg and Romania.

Overview

Parliamentary Assembly of the Council of Europe

Committee of the Regions
PES has 122 members in the Committee of the Regions as of 2014.

References

External links 

 Party of European Socialists, official website
 Parliamentary Group of the Party of European Socialists, official website
 European Youth Plan campaign, official website
 PES Group in the Committee of the Regions, official website

 
Political parties established in 1973
Political parties established in 1992
Pan-European political parties
Centre-left parties in Europe
Social democratic parties
Socialist International